Zhanna is a given name, Russian form of Jeanne. Notable people with the name include:

Zhanna Agalakova (born 1965), Russian journalist
Zhanna Bichevskaya (born 1944), prominent Russian bard and folk musician
Zhanna Friske (1974–2015), Russian film actress, singer, and socialite
Zhanna Pintusevich-Block (born 1972), sprinter who has competed in the Olympic Games
Zhanna Prokhorenko (1940–2011), actress who starred in Grigori Chukhrai's 1959 film Ballad of a Soldier